Stri is a 1995 Indian Telugu-language drama film featuring Rohini and Thalaivasal Vijay. It was written by Palagummi Padmaraju with screenplay and direction by K. S. Sethumadhavan. The film garnered two National Film Awards, two Nandi Awards and was showcased in the Indian Panorama section, International Film Festival of India and 2nd Prague International Film Festival.

Plot 
The film deals with a lively and poignant village woman longing for love from her unpredictable paramour.

Awards 
National Film Awards
Best  Feature Film in Telugu – 1995
National Film Award – Special Mention – Rohini

Nandi Awards - 1995
Special Jury Award for Best Performance - Rohini
Special Jury Award for Direction - K. S. Sethumadhavan

References 

1990s Telugu-language films
1995 films
Best Telugu Feature Film National Film Award winners
Films directed by K. S. Sethumadhavan

Indian drama films